The following is List of Universities and Colleges in Shaanxi.

National
Xi'an Jiaotong University Double First Class University Plan
Northwest A&F University Double First Class University Plan
Xidian University Double First Class University Plan
Shaanxi Normal University Double First Class University Plan
Chang'an University Double First Class University Plan

Ministry of Industry and Information Technology
Northwestern Polytechnical University Double First Class University Plan

Military

Air Force Engineering University
The Fourth Military Medical University Double First Class University Plan
PLA Rocket Force University of Engineering
PLA Xi'an Telecommunication College
PLA Xi'an College of Political Sciences

Provincial

Private

Note: Institutions without full-time bachelor programs are not listed.

References

List of Chinese Higher Education Institutions — Ministry of Education
List of Chinese universities, including official links
Shaanxi Institutions Admitting International Students
陕西高校网址导航陕西大学名单（2008）
陕西本科普通高校名单

 
Shaanxi